"Marge Gamer" is the seventeenth episode of the eighteenth season of the American animated television series The Simpsons. It originally aired on the Fox network in the United States on April 22, 2007. It was written by J. Stewart Burns and featured a guest appearance from Brazilian soccer star Ronaldo.

This episode was first broadcast three days after the twenty-year anniversary of the first ever appearance of The Simpsons on television, in The Tracey Ullman Shows short "Good Night".

Plot
Marge is embarrassed at a Parent-Teacher Association meeting because she does not have an e-mail address. She decides to buy her own computer and is quite taken by the Internet. Quickly becoming bored with her lack of email messages she repeatedly hits the refresh button causing new advertising banners to appear. A banner ad for a MMORPG called Earthland Realms catches her attention. Marge clicks on it and soon creates a character for the game. She begins exploring the local town and interacting with game personas, all of whom are Springfield residents including Apu the gem trader, Seymour Skinner the turkey, Moe who resembles a troll, Edna Krabappel the enchantress, Snake the Cobra King, Chief Wiggum the pig man, Smithers the Barbarian, Comic Book Guy the fully armored crusader-like warrior, and Sideshow Mel as a creature who looks surprisingly like a Tauren.

Suddenly, everyone hides as a knight named "The Shadow Knight" appears riding a menacing black horse. The Shadow Knight is the most powerful and deadly character in the game (having once beaten Moe to death with his own life bar). While offline, Marge walks by Bart's bedroom door and unintentionally overhears that Bart is the Shadow Knight. Back in the game, Marge goes to the Shadow Knight's castle and meets Milhouse who is cursed to look like a female servant as a result of an evil spell. Marge constantly frets about Bart and, to Bart's dismay, redecorates his "trophy room" with the Hello Kitty expansion pack. In a fit of rage, Bart smashes many of the decorations with a mace and accidentally kills Marge's character which severely disappoints real world Marge.

Meanwhile, Homer referees Lisa's soccer game. His subpar skills frustrate Lisa. Stung by her criticism, Homer learns the rules of soccer and becomes a better referee, briefly impressing Lisa. While playing soccer, Lisa trips when trying to steal the ball from another player. Homer calls a foul and gives the ball to Lisa. Upon getting the ball, Lisa decides to take advantage of the situation and pretends to be fouled hoping that Homer would grant her penalties. When Brazilian footballer  Ronaldo points out that Lisa is a "flopper", Homer gives Lisa a yellow card. Angry, Lisa rips up the yellow card, causing Homer to give her a red card for unsportsmanlike conduct and to eject her from the game.

Homer and Bart go to Moe's Tavern to escape the troubles that have occurred with Marge and Lisa. Moe gives them surprisingly good advice about their situations. Homer jokingly asks "What have you done with the real Moe?" and everyone laughs. A cutaway shot reveals that the real Moe is bound and gagged in the room next-door. Acting on fake Moe's advice, Bart makes up for killing his mother's character by reviving her with two-thirds of his life force. Revived, Marge tends to the Shadow Knight; however, other characters raid the castle to take advantage of his weakened state and brutally kill the Shadow Knight. Surprisingly, Bart is blasé about his character's death and decides to go outside and play.

In the real world, Homer enters Lisa's room. He offers her a BBC documentary produced in cooperation with Canal+ about "floppers", hoping that she will forgive him. Watching the documentary, Lisa realizes it was she that was at fault. Instead of forgiving Homer, Lisa apologizes for her injustice against him. Homer, Bart, Lisa and Maggie play a game of soccer in their back yard; however, Marge continues gaming inside. Feeling sorry for Bart, Marge dons the Shadow Knight armor and begins a revenge campaign for him starting by juggling Moe's character head like a soccer ball as he wonders why he pays $14.95 a month to play the game.

Cultural references
Earthland Realms is a parody of 2000s MMORPGs, combining elements of RuneScape, Asheron's Call and World of Warcraft.

In the documentary Lisa watches about "floppers", a fight scene occurs between the Virgin Mary and a horde of Brazilian soccer hooligans. Adagio for Strings is played during this scene, although the piece was uncredited. In addition, the scene is a partial shot-for-shot remake of the fight scene between Neo and Agent Smith in The Matrix Reloaded.

The scene where the townsfolk kill the Shadow Knight is a reference to a similar scene in Monty Python and the Holy Grail.

Reception
Adam Finley of TV Squad felt "the Homer/Lisa story might have worked better as the main plot, but even that segment of the episode was hindered by a terrible guest voice in soccer player Ronaldo". He went on to say: "I hate it when non-actors do guest voices on The Simpsons" and that "bad voice acting becomes much more of a distraction".

In 2007, Simon Crerar of The Times listed Ronaldo's performance as one of the thirty-three funniest cameos in the history of the show.

Robert Canning of IGN gave the episode a 4.5/10 rating.

References

External links

 
 Earthland Realms

2007 American television episodes
The Simpsons (season 18) episodes
Association football culture